The 2018–19 Tunisian Ligue Professionnelle 2 (Tunisian Professional League) is the 64th season since Tunisia's independence.

Teams

Group A
AS Ariana
AS Djerba
AS Marsa
AS Oued Ellil
AS Soliman
CO Médenine
CS Korba
ES Zarzis
ES Jerba
Olympique Béja
Sfax Railway Sports
US Siliana

Group B
AS Kasserine
CS Jbeniana
CS Chebba
EGS Gafsa
ES Hammam-Sousse
EO Sidi Bouzid
ES Radès
Jendouba Sport
Océano Club de Kerkennah
Sporting Ben Arous
Stade Africain Menzel Bourguiba
Stade Sportif Sfaxien

Results

Group A

Table

Result table

Group B

Table

Result table

See also
2018–19 Tunisian Ligue Professionnelle 1
2018–19 Tunisian Cup

References

External links
 2018–19 Ligue 2 on RSSSF.com
 Fédération Tunisienne de Football

Tunisian Ligue Professionnelle 2 seasons